Fischlham is a municipality in the district of Wels-Land in the Austrian state of Upper Austria.

Geography
Fischlham lies in the Hausruckviertel. About 19 percent of the municipality is forest, and 69 percent is farmland.

Personalities
It is notable for being the location of  Adolf Hitler's first two years of formal schooling, from 1895 to 1897.

Sons and daughters of the location 
 Paula Hitler (1896-1960), the only full sister of Adolf Hitler

References

Cities and towns in Wels-Land District